Axel P. Lehmann (born 1959) is the chairman of Credit Suisse and has been since January 2022.

Early life
Lehmann was born in 1959, and is a Swiss citizen. He earned an MBA and a PhD from the University of St. Gallen. He is an adjunct professor at the university.

Career
Lehmann worked for 20 years in insurance, briefly at Swiss Life before joining Zurich Insurance Group, where he was chief risk officer from 2009 and 2015. He was a non-executive director of UBS from 2009 to 2015 before joining the bank full-time, and in 2016 he appointed its chief operating officer. He was president of UBS Switzerland from 2018 and 2021. In October 2021, Lehmann became a board member of Credit Suisse as head of its risk committee.

In January 2022, Lehmann succeeded António Horta-Osório as chairman of Credit Suisse after he resigned due to repeated breaches of COVID regulations.

References

Living people
Credit Suisse people
UBS people
University of St. Gallen alumni
Academic staff of the University of St. Gallen
1959 births